Ounhmangu is a type of shredded coconut candy popular in Myanmar (Burma), and is made from sugar, shredded coconut, and oil.

References

See also
 Coconut candy

Burmese desserts and snacks
Foods containing coconut